Jo-Wilfried Tsonga was the defending champion, but withdrew with a left knee injury before the tournament began.

Lucas Pouille won the title, defeating Dominic Thiem in the final, 7–6(7–5), 6–2.

Seeds
The top four seeds receive a bye into the second round.

Draw

Finals

Top half

Bottom half

Qualifying

Seeds

Qualifiers

Qualifying draw

First qualifier

Second qualifier

Third qualifier

Fourth qualifier

References
 Main draw
 Qualifying draw

Singles